The OpenDisc project offered a selection of high quality open source software on a disc for Microsoft Windows users. The aims of the project were "to provide a free alternative to costly software, with equal or often better quality equivalents to proprietary, shareware or freeware software for Microsoft Windows", and "to educate users of Linux as an operating system for home, business and educational use".

The project was created in September 2007 by former OpenCD project lead Chris Gray, who cited numerous difficulties which he believed were negatively affecting the progress of the Canonical-sponsored project. As of 27 September 2007, the OpenCD project is no longer under active development (the former OpenCD project was replaced by OpenDisc).  The last updates to the OpenDisc project seem to have been in September 2012.

Contents
Each version contains a GUI menu that offers a description and installer for each program.

Version 12.09 includes what were the latest versions of the following software in September 2012:
Design: Blender, Dia, The GIMP, Inkscape, Scribus, Tux Paint
Educational: CaRMetal, Guido van Robot, Maxima
Games: The Battle for Wesnoth, Enigma, Freeciv, FreeCol, Nevergames, PokerTH, Sokoban YASC, TuxMath, TuxType
Internet: Alliance, Azureus (now Vuze), FileZilla, Firefox, HTTrack, Miro, Pidgin, RSSOwl, SeaMonkey, Thunderbird, TightVNC
Multimedia: Audacity, Avidemux, Celestia, InfraRecorder, Really Slick Screensavers, Songbird, Stellarium, Sumatra PDF, TuxGuitar, VLC media player
Productivity: DjVuLibre, FreeMind, GanttProject, GnuCash, Notepad2, LibreOffice
Utilities: 7-Zip, Abakt, ClamWin, GTK+, TrueCrypt, Workrave

Version 11.09  includes what were the latest versions of the following software as of September 2011:
Design: Blender, Dia, The GIMP, Inkscape, Nvu, Scribus, Tux Paint
Games: The Battle for Wesnoth, Enigma, Neverball, Sokoban YASC
Internet: Azureus (now Vuze), FileZilla, Firefox, HTTrack, Pidgin, RSSOwl, SeaMonkey, Thunderbird, TightVNC, WinSCP
Multimedia: Audacity, Celestia, Really Slick Screensavers, Stellarium, Sumatra PDF, VLC media player
Productivity: GnuCash, MoinMoin, Notepad2, LibreOffice, PDFCreator
Utilities: 7-Zip, Abakt, ClamWin, GTK+, HealthMonitor, TrueCrypt, Workrave

Derivatives
There are several derivatives of the OpenDisc:

OpenEducationDisc 10.10: simple English interface for students aged 11+, focused on educational functionality, several programs included which aren't in the OpenDisc such as GANTT Project, GraphCalc; chosen for their educational use. It won the Teach First school project competition in 2007.
Translations: in progress .
VALO-CD: a Finnish project similar to OpenDisc.

See also

WinLibre
Open Source Software CD
LoLiWin

References

External links

Development blog

Free software distributions
Projects established in 2007